Rosalie Rendu (9 September 1786 – 7 February 1856) was a Daughter of Charity who was a leading worker and organizer of care for the poor of 19th-century Paris' teeming slums, suffering from the rapid migration of people to the cities during the course of the Industrial Revolution. She was beatified by the Catholic Church for the holiness of her life. Her feast day is 7 February.

Life
She was born Jeanne-Marie Rendu on 9 September 1786, in Confort, France, not far from Geneva. The eldest of four girls, she came from a family of small property owners which enjoyed a certain affluence and respect throughout the area. She was baptized the day she was born in the parish church of Lancrans. Her godfather by proxy was Jacques Emery, a family friend and future Superior General of the Society of Saint-Sulpice (Sulpicians) in Paris.

Rendu was three years old when the Revolution broke out. Starting in 1790 it was compulsory for the clergy to take an oath of support for the Civil Constitution of the Clergy. Numerous priests, faithful to the Church, refused to take this oath. They were driven from their parishes, with some being put to death and others having to hide to escape their pursuers. The Rendu family home became a refuge for these priests, some fleeing to Switzerland. The Bishop of Annecy found asylum there under the assumed name of Pierre. Jeanne-Marie was fascinated by this hired hand who was treated better than the others. One night she discovered that he was celebrating a Mass.

It was in this atmosphere of faith, exposed to the dangers of denunciation, that Rendu was educated. She made her First Communion one night by candlelight in the basement of her home. This exceptional environment forged her character.

The death of her father, 12 May 1796, and that of her youngest sister, at four months of age, on 19 July of the same year, shook the entire family. Rendu, aware of her responsibility as the eldest, helped her mother, especially in caring for her younger sisters.

Madame Rendu, concerned about the education of her eldest daughter, sent her to the Ursuline Sisters in Gex. Jeanne Marie stayed two years in this boarding school. She was "highly intelligent" but her education was essentially practical. During her walks in town, she discovered the hospital where the Daughters of Charity cared for the sick. She had only one desire, to go and join them. Her mother gave her consent that Jeanne-Marie, in spite of her young age, might spend some time at this hospital. There she gained some experience in caring for the sick.

Daughter of Charity
Having decided to join the Daughters of Charity, on 25 May 1802, Rendu arrived at the Motherhouse on the Rue du Vieux Colombier in Paris. She was nearly 17 years old. The reopening of the novitiate (suppressed by the Revolutionaries) took place in December 1800. On their arrival, the travelers were welcomed by fifty young women in formation.  Upon entering the community, she was given the name of Rosalie.

As a young sister, Rendu suffered from a delicate constitution that was weakened by the sustained seclusion required of the novices, and by a lack of physical exercise. On the advice of her physician and that of her godfather, the Abbé Emery, Rendu was sent to house of the Daughters of Charity on Rue des Francs-Bourgeois-Saint-Marcel in the Mouffetard District. She remained there 54 years.

At the time, it was one of the most impoverished districts of the quickly expanding capital, with poverty in all its forms, psychological and spiritual. The houses were dilapidated and damp, the streets narrow and squalid, with refuse-filled streams running across them. She made her "apprenticeship" accompanying sisters visiting the sick and the poor. Between times, she taught catechism and reading to little girls accepted at the free school. In 1807, Rendu, surrounded by the Sisters of her Community, made vows for the first time to serve God and the poor.

Sister Servant

In 1815 Rendu became the Sister Servant (local religious superior) of the community at the Rue des Francs-Bourgeois. Two years later the community would move to the Rue de l'Épée de Bois for reasons of space and convenience. "Her poor," as she would call them, became more and more numerous during this troubled time. She worked with the Department of Welfare established by the Napoleonic government, administering a program that provided vouchers for coal and food. She sent her Sisters into all the hidden recesses of St. Médard Parish in order to bring supplies, clothing, care and a comforting word.

She dealt with the poor with great consideration, guessing that they are much more sensitive to the manner in which one helps them than to the help itself. "One of the greatest ways of doing good to the poor", she affirmed, "is to show them respect and consideration." Rendu's example encouraged her Sisters.  Rendu found her strength in a saying of the founder of the Daughters, Vincent de Paul: "You will go and visit the poor ten times a day, and ten times a day you will find God there ... you go into their poor homes, but you find God there." Her prayer life was intense, as a Sister affirmed, "... she continually lived in the presence of God."

Rendu was attentive to assuring that her companions had time for prayer, but sometimes there was a need to "leave God for God" as Vincent de Paul taught his Daughters. Once, while accompanying a Sister on a charitable visit, she said to her: "Sister, let's begin our meditation!" She suggested the plan, the outline, in a few simple, clear words and entered into prayer. Like a monk in the cloister, Rendu walked everywhere with her God. She would speak to God of this family in distress as the father no longer had any work, of this elderly person who risked dying alone in an attic: "Never have I prayed so well as in the streets," she would say.

Superiors sent Rendu postulants and young Sisters to train. They put in her house, for a period of time, Sisters who were somewhat difficult or fragile. To one of her Sisters in crisis, she gave this advice one day, which is the secret of her life: "If you want someone to love you, you must be the first to love; and if you have nothing to give, give yourself." As the number of Sisters increased, the charity office became a house of charity, with a clinic and a school. She saw in that the Providence of God.

In the outbreaks which followed the Revolution of 1830 Archbishop Quelen and other clergy took shelter at the Rue de l'Épée de Bois.

To assist all the suffering, Rendu opened a free clinic, a pharmacy, a school, a child and maternal care center, a youth club for young workers and a home for the elderly without resources. For young girls and needy mothers, Rendu soon organized courses in sewing and embroidering. Soon a whole network of charitable services would be established to counter poverty.

Rendu was very mindful of the manner of receiving the poor. Her spirit of faith saw in them our "lords and masters." "The poor will insult you. The ruder they are; the more dignified you must be," she said. "Remember, Our Lord hides behind those rags." One of Rendu's companions remarked that, "the poor themselves noted her way of praying and acting." "Humble in her authority, Sr. Rosalie would correct us with great sensitivity and had the gift of consoling. Her advice, spoken justly and given with all her affection, penetrated souls."

Rendu's reputation quickly grew in all the districts of the capital and also beyond to the towns in the region. She knew how to surround herself with many efficient and dedicated collaborators. The donations flowed in quickly as the rich were unable to resist this persuasive woman. Even the former royalty did not forget her in their generosity. Bishops, priests, the Spanish Ambassador, King Charles X, the powerful General Louis-Eugène Cavaignac, and the most distinguished men of state and culture, even the Emperor Napoleon III with his wife, were often seen in her parlor.

Students of law, medicine, science, technology, engineering, teacher‑training, and all the other important schools came seeking from Rendu information and recommendations. Or, before performing a good work, they asked her at which door they should knock. Rendu became the center of a charitable movement that characterized Paris and France in the first half of the 19th century. Her experience was priceless for these young people. She directed their apostolate, guided their coming and going in the suburbs, and gave them addresses of families in need, choosing them with care. Afterwards, she facilitated discussion and apostolic reflection on their experiences among persons who were poor.

Her cousin, Eugene Rendu, said wrote of her: "Sister Rosalie’s principal character trait was her common sense, pushed to the point of genius." In 1833 began mentoring the first members of the Society of Saint Vincent de Paul. Among these, Frédéric Ozanam, founder of the "Society of St. Vincent de Paul," and Jean Léon Le Prevost, future founder of the Religious of St. Vincent de Paul, knew well the road to her office. They came, with their other friends, to Rendu seeking advice for undertaking their projects.

In 1840 she helped re-establish the Ladies of Charity, who helped in the home visits. In 1851 she took over the running of an orphanage.

Rendu also formed a relationship with the Superior of Bon Saveur in Caen and requested that she too welcome those in need. She was particularly attentive to priests and religious suffering from psychiatric difficulties. Her correspondence is short but touching, considerate, patient and respectful towards all.

Hardships were not lacking in the Mouffetard District. Epidemics of cholera followed one after another. Lack of hygiene and poverty fostered its virulence. Most particularly in 1832 and 1846, the dedication shown and risks taken by Rendu and her Sisters were beyond imagination. The sisters attended to the living, accompanied the dying, and buried the dead. She herself was seen picking up dead bodies in the streets.

In February 1848, barricades and bloody battles were the marks of the opposition of the working class stirred up against the powerful. The Archbishop of Paris, Denis Auguste Affre, was killed trying to intervene between the fighting factions. Rendu was deeply grieved by this. She herself climbed the barricades to try to help the wounded fighters without considering their political loyalties in the fight. Without any fear, she risked her life in these confrontations. Her courage and sense of freedom commanded the admiration of all.

When order was reestablished, Rendu tried to save a number of these people she knew and who were victims of fierce repression. She was helped a great deal by the mayor of the district, Dr. Ulysse Trélat, a true republican, who was also very popular.

In 1852, Napoleon III decided to give her the Grand Cross of the Legion of Honor. She was ready to refuse this individual honor but Jean-Baptiste Etienne, Superior General of the Congregation of the Mission and the Daughters of Charity, made her accept it.

Death

Always in fragile health, Rendu never took a moment of rest, always managing to overcome fatigue and fevers. However, age, increasing infirmity, and the amount of work needing to be done eventually broke her strong resistance and equally strong will. During the last two years of her life she became progressively blind. She died on 7 February 1856 after a brief but acute illness.

Emotions ran high in the district and at all levels of society in both Paris and the countryside. After the funeral rite at St. Médard Church, her parish, a large and emotional crowd followed her remains to the Montparnasse Cemetery. They came to show their respect for the works she had accomplished and show their affection for this "out of the ordinary" Sister.

Numerous newspaper articles witnessed to the admiration and even veneration that Rendu received. Newspapers from all sides echoed the sentiments of the people.

L'Univers, the principal Catholic newspaper of the time, edited by Louis Veuillot, wrote as early as 8 February: "Our readers understand the significance of the sadness that has come upon the poor of Paris. They join their sufferings with the tears and prayers of the unfortunate".

Le Constitutionnel, the newspaper of the anticlerical left, did not hesitate to announce the death of this Daughter of Charity: "The unfortunate people of the 12th district have just experienced a regrettable loss. Sr. Rosalie, Superior of the Community at rue de l'Epée de Bois died yesterday after a long illness. For many years this respectable woman was the salvation of the numerous needy in this district".

The official newspaper of the Empire, le Moniteur Universel, praised the kindly actions of this Sister: "Funeral honors were given to Sr. Rosalie with unusual splendor. For more than fifty years this holy woman was a friend to others in a district where there are many unfortunate people to care for and all these grateful people accompanied her remains to the church and to the cemetery. A guard of honor was part of the cortege".

Many visitors came to the cemetery to meditate and pray but had difficulty locating the common gravesite reserved for the Daughters of Charity. The body was then moved to a more accessible plot, close to the entrance of the cemetery. On the simple tomb surmounted by a large Cross are engraved these words: "To Sister Rosalie, from her grateful friends, the rich and the poor". Flowers continue to be placed at her gravesite.

She was beatified on the 9th of November, 2003 by Pope John Paul II.

Notes

References
 Alban Butler, 2007, Lives of the Saints, Forgotten Books  p. 301
 Armand Marie Joachim Melun, 1915 Life of Sister Rosalie,: A sister of charity, Plimpton press
 The life of Sœur Rosalie: of the Daughters of St. Vincent de Paul Burns and Lambert, London, 1858.

External links
 Pope John Paul II, Homily on the Beatification of Five Servants of God, November 9, 2003
 "Mutuality in Ministry: Rosalie Rendu and Frederic Ozanam" - slide presentation

1786 births
1856 deaths
People from Ain
Daughters and Sisters of Charity of St. Vincent de Paul
Grand Croix of the Légion d'honneur
Burials at Montparnasse Cemetery
French beatified people
Vincentian beatified people
19th-century venerated Christians
Beatifications by Pope John Paul II
Venerated Catholics by Pope John Paul II
French blind people